Fairy is an unincorporated community located in Hamilton County in Central Texas.

History
Fairy was originally known as Martin's Gap. James Martin was a settler who took an oxcart through the mountain gap. The town was named for Fairy Fort, the daughter of Confederate Army captain Battle Fort, when the post office was established in 1884. Fairy had a cotton gin from 1900 to about 1936 and schools, churches, and businesses serving the greater ranching and farming community. In 1947, Fairy had a post office, three churches, three businesses, and 150 people. The post office closed in 1957, and the Fairy school district was consolidated with the Hamilton schools in 1967. In 1980, 1990, and 2000 the population was 31. Its population went up to 40 in 2019.

Geography
Fairy is located in the northern part of the county at the junction of FM 219 and FM 1602.

Education
Fairy is served by the Hamilton Independent School District.

References 

Unincorporated communities in Texas
Unincorporated communities in Hamilton County, Texas
Ghost towns in Central Texas